Bade Achhe Lagte Hain (English: They Look So Good) is a Hindi Indian soap opera that aired on Sony Entertainment Television from 30 May 2011 to 10 July 2014. Based on the Gujarati play Patrani by Imtiaz Patel, the soap opera was created and produced by Ekta Kapoor under the banner of Balaji Telefilms. The title of the show, along with the title-track, was derived from a song composed by R.D. Burman, from the soundtrack of the 1976 Bollywood film Balika Badhu. Ekta Kapoor had got the name, Bade Achhe Lagte Hain, registered about six years before the soap opera premiered.

The show explores the worlds of Priya Sharma (Sakshi Tanwar) and Ram Kapoor (Ram Kapoor), who accidentally discover love after getting married. After the storyline moved five years ahead in June 2012, many new actors and characters, including Samir Kochhar and Amrita Mukherjee who played the roles of Rajat Kapur and Peehu respectively, were introduced.

According to The Times of India, Bade Achhe Lagte Hain is the seventh most-watched television show of 2011 in India. The soap opera won the Kalakar Award for the Best Serial  and the People's Choice Award for Favourite TV Drama, both in 2012. The soap opera was voted the Most Inspiring Soap in 2013, receiving a vote count of 43.68%. It has been dubbed and rebroadcast in English, Tamil, and Telugu.

Plot

Ram Kapoor is an unmarried, wealthy, established, and well-reputed Mumbai-based businessman in his early forties. Priya Sharma is a working woman in her early thirties and comes from a middle-class Mumbai family. Ram's half-sister, Natasha Kapoor, and Priya's brother, Kartik Sharma fall in love and have to consider the Hindu culture taboo of younger siblings marrying before their elder siblings. Ram has yet to select a prospective spouse so the marriage of Kartik and Natasha is pending.

There is a solution. Ram and Priya agree to the Punjabi practice of watta satta although Priya dislikes the economic disparity between their families. Ram and Priya considers each other arrogant and quarrelsome. They become closer with time and consummate their marriage.
 
Kartik and Natasha are about to divorce as Natasha is unable to adapt to her reduced economic status. The divorce provokes disagreements between Ram and Priya. Priya, however solves things between Kartik and Natasha and mends their marriage. Priya is pregnant, has an accident that others believe has killed her. She moves to Dubai.

5 years later
In Dubai, Priya lives with her and Ram's daughter, Pihu. Ram and Priya cross paths. Ram is furious at Priya for abandoning him and seeks custody of Pihu. Priya returns to Kapoors to be with Ram. They have daughters, Myra and Pari.

8 years later
Pihu, Myra and Pari are grown up. Pihu, who is a spoiled brat now, falls in love with her college friend Varun. Priya objects this as Varun's father was probable candidate for Ram. This makes Pihu to hate Priya. Priya finds Pihu and Varun together. Pihu accuses Varun of raping her. Priya finds the truth and tries to rectify Pihu's misdeeds. Varun is shocked by Pihu's betrayal and kills himself. Priya and Pihu meet with an accident and Priya falls into a coma.

7 years later
Priya recovers and returns to the Kapoors'. Priya's friend, Juhi, has cared for Pihu, Myra and Pari. Juhi falls in love with Ram and tries to make him divorce Priya, getting Ram's sympathy for her daughter, Naina. Pihu falls in love with Samar, who has an affair with Priya's doctor, Suhani. Priya finds this and objects to Pihu's relationship. Pihu threatens to kill herself if she cannot marry Samar, so her parents acquiesce. Suhani is pregnant with Samar's child. She kills Samar after his marriage with Pihu. Ram is accused of Samar's murder and is arrested. Priya proves his innocence and Pihu reunites with her. Juhi works to separate Ram and Priya, but is exposed, arrested and Ram and Priya reunite.

Cast

Main
 Sakshi Tanwar as Priya Sharma Kapoor – Shipra and Sudhir's elder daughter; Ayesha and Kartik's sister; Ram's wife; Pihu, Mayra and Pari's mother (2011–14)
 Ram Kapoor as Ram Kapoor – Amarnath and Krishna's son; Natasha and Rishab's half-brother; Priya's husband; Pihu, Mayra and Pari's father (2011–14)
 Fenil Umrigar / Sonia Balani as Pihu Kapoor Shergill – Ram and Priya's eldest daughter; Mayra and Pari's sister; Samar's wife (2013–14)
 Aanchal Munjal as Teenage Pihu Kapoor (2013)
 Amrita Mukherjee as Child Pihu Kapoor (2012–13)

Recurring
 Sumona Chakravarti as Natasha Kapoor – Amarnath and Niharika's daughter; Rishabh's sister, Siddhant and Ishika's half-sister; Ram’s half-sister; Kartik's first wife (2011–14)
 Madhu Raja as Krishna Kapoor – Amarnath's first wife; Ram's mother; Apeksha's adoptive mother; Pihu, Mayra and Pari's grandmother (2011–14)
 Chahat Khanna / Akanksha Juneja as Ayesha Sharma – Shipra and Sudhir's younger daughter; Priya and Kartik's sister; Siddhant's fiancée; Khush's mother (2011–13)
 Eva Grover as Niharika Talwar Kapoor – Shiney's sister; Jayesh ex-wife; Amarnath's second wife; Ram's step-mother; Siddhant, Ishika, Natasha and Rishab's mother; Khush's grandmother (2011–13) 
 Jai Kalra as Vikram Shergill – Neha's husband; Ram's friend and business partner; Rahul, Samar and Riddhima's father (2011–14)
 Tarana Raja Kapoor as Neha Shergill – Vikram's wife; Rahul, Samar and Riddhima's mother (2011–14)
 Salim Shah / Deepak Qazir Kejriwal as Shiney Talwar (Mamaji) – Niharika's brother; Ram's uncle; Saudamini's boyfriend (2011–14)
 Mahesh Shetty as Siddhant Karyekar – Jayesh and Niharika's son; Ishika's brother; Natasha and Rishab's half-brother; Ayesha's fiancé; Khush's father (2011–14)
 Shubhavi Choksey as Juhi – Priya's childhood friend; Naina's mother (2011–14) 
 Gaurav Sharma / Aditya Kapadia / Ankit Narang as Khush Karyekar – Siddhant and Ayesha's son; Ram and Priya's nephew (2013–14)
 Neev Ritesh Jain as Child Kush Karyekar (2012–13)
 Vinti Idnani as Mayra Kapoor – Ram and Priya's second daughter; Pihu and Pari's sister (2013–14)
 Ashnoor Kaur as Child Mayra Kapoor (2013)
 Pragati Chourasiya as Pari Kapoor – Ram and Priya's youngest daughter; Pihu and Mayra's sister (2013–14)
 Zaynah Vastani as Child Pari Kapoor (2013)
 Rohan Shah / Yuvraj Thakur / Lavin Gothi as Samar "Sammy" Shergill – Vikram and Neha's son; Riddhima and Rahul's brother; Pihu's husband; Suhani's fiancé; Gudiya's father (2013–14)
 Mohit Malhotra / Chirag Thakkar as Kartik Sharma – Shipra and Sudhir's son; Priya and Ayesha's brother; Natasha and Jhanvi's husband; Raunak's father
 Renuka Israni as Shipra Sharma – Sudhir's wife; Priya, Ayesha and Kartik's mother; Pihu, Khush, Mayra, Pari and Raunak's grandmother
 Prithvi Sankhala as Sudhir Sharma – Shipra's husband; Priya, Ayesha and Kartik's father; Pihu, Khush, Mayra, Pari and Raunak's grandfather
 Rajinder Kaur Manchanda as Mrs. Kapoor (Dadi) – Amarnath's mother; Ram, Natasha and Rishab's grandmother
 Samir Kochhar as Rajat Kapoor – Ram's friend; Jyoti's ex-boyfriend
 Ekta Kaul as Dr. Suhani Malhotra – Priya's nurse; Samar's fiancée; Gudiya's mother
 Sunny Goraya as Rishabh Kapoor – Amarnath and Niharika's son; Natasha's brother; Ram, Siddhant and Ishika's half-brother; Saumya's husband
 Dipti Shrikant / Amrin Chakkiwala as Saumya Kapoor – Rishabh's wife
 Nitin Sahrawat as Rajeev – Juhi's husband
 Niti Taylor as Naina – Juhi's and Rajeev's daughter
 Azaan Rustam Shah / Anshul Pandey as Rahul Shergill – Vikram and Neha's son; Samar and Riddhima's brother
 Ruhee Bagga as Riddhima Shergill – Vikram and Neha's daughter; Samar and Rahul's sister
 Kanika Shivpuri as Daai Jaa – Rajat's aunt and caretaker
 Priya Marathe as Jyoti Malhotra – Rajat's ex-girlfriend; Kadambari's mother
 Arshima Thapar as Kadambari Malhotra – Rahul's wife; Jyoti's daughter
 Vaibhav Joshi as Rehaan – Neha's son from her colleague
 Sonal Parihar as Jhanvi Sharma – Kartik's second wife; Raunak's mother
 Yatin Mehta as Raunak Sharma – Kartik and Jhanvi's son; Sudhir and Shipla's grandson; Natasha's adopted son 
 Harsh Khurana as Ashwin Khanna – Priya's ex-fiancé; Shruti's husband; Varun's father
 Madhumita Das as Shruti Khanna – Ashwin's wife; Priya's friend; Varun's mother
 Rohan Mehra as Varun Khanna – Ashwin and Shruti's son; Pihu's college friend (Dead)
 Amit Bhalla as Dr. Jayesh Karyekar – Niharika's first husband; Siddhant and Ishika's father; Khush's grandfather
 Asha Negi as Apeksha Malhotra – Krishna's adoptive daughter; Ram's adoptive sister (2011–12)
 Kajal Pisal as Ishika Kapoor Dhanrajgir – Jayesh and Niharika's daughter; Siddhant's sister; Natasha and Rishabh's half-sister; Aditya's wife
 Parakh Madan as Harry
 Saptrishi Ghosh as Rishi Shandeliya - Priya's boss
 Karan Veer Mehra as Bhanu Shergill; Vikram's brother
 Charu Asopa as Saudamini - Ayesha's friend; Shiney (Mamaji)'s girlfriend
 Anshuman Singh Mahant as Shags – Natasha'a colleague
 Rakshanda Khan as Isha Singhania; Ram's crush; Ram, Vikram, and Neha's college friend
 Rushad Rana as Ram, Vikram, and Neha's college friend
 Dimpy Ganguli as Preetika; Ayesha's friend
 Karan Jotwani as Mandeep Bittu Singh — Pihu's ex-fiancé
 Nandini Sen as Nandini Bittu Singh; Mandeep's mother
 Mamta Luthra as Shipra's mother; Sudhir's mother-in-law; Priya, Kartik and Ayesha's grandmother
 Jai Shahideu as Saksh
 Nivin Ramani as Robin
 Neel Motwani as Daljeet Kapoor; Ram, Natasha and Rishab's cousin
 Bobby Arora as Bobby Singh
 Loveleen Kaur Sasan as Jenny; Ram's Office secretary
 Rajdeep Sikdar as himself; Ram's Office staff

Guest appearances
 Akshay Kumar to promote his film Once Upon ay Time in Mumbai Dobaara!
 Jackky Bhagnani and Neha Sharma to promote their film Youngistaan
 Priyanka Chopra and Ram Charan to promote their film Zanjeer
 Ronit Roy to promote his television series Adaalat
 Sanaya Irani to promote her television series Chhanchhan 
 Tusshar Kapoor and John Abraham to promote their film Shootout at Wadala
 Tusshar Kapoor and Riteish Deshmukh to promote their film Kyaa Super Kool Hain Hum
 Vidya Balan and Emraan Hashmi to promote their film The Dirty Picture 
 Vidya Balan to promote her film Shaadi Ke Side Effects

Production

Development
The name of the soap opera, along with its title track, has been inspired by a song of the same name, composed by R. D. Burman, from the soundtrack of the 1976 Bollywood film Balika Badhu. Based on the Gujarati play Patrani by Imtiaz Patel, the soap opera is created by Ekta Kapoor and produced by her production company Balaji Telefilms. Ekta Kapoor had got the name, Bade Achhe Lagte Hain, registered about six years before the soap opera premiered.

Filming

Bade Achhe Lagte Hain  is reportedly one of the soap operas in India which broke the monotone of endless indoors-only sequences. Most of its shooting has been done in India. But many episodes of the soap opera have also been shot in foreign locales. Sixteen episodes of the soap opera (episodes 102–117) were shot in Australia over 14 days, in partnership with Tourism Australia, in late 2011, to portray the honeymoon of Ram (Ram Kapoor) and Priya (Sakshi Tanwar). Bade Achhe Lagte Hain also received support from Destination New South Wales, Sony Entertainment Television India and Balaji Telefilms.

During the summer of 2012, Ekta Kapoor introduced a five-year leap in the narrative. After this leap, thirty six episodes of Bade Achhe Lagte Hain (episodes 235–270) had content which was shot in Dubai, UAE over a period of 10 days. These episodes portray Priya (Sakshi Tanwar) living with her five-year-old daughter Peehu (Amrita Mukherjee) in the city until she has to return to Mumbai, in India. The production team failed to obtain the correct permits to shoot in Dubai and had to briefly stop shooting until the paperwork was processed.

Music 
The title track of the soap opera, inspired by the song Bade Achhe Lagte Hain is composed by R. D. Burman, from the 1976 Bollywood movie, Balika Badhu. The lyrics of the soap opera's title track have been penned up by Nawab Arzoo and the title track has been sung by Shreya Ghoshal and Trijayh Dey. Lalit Sen provided the music to the title track. The background music or the incidental music of the soap opera has been provided by Abhishek Singh and Mintu Jha. It also includes songs from soundtrack albums of few Bollywood movies. The Tamil version of the title track song was sung by Shweta Mohan, with hummings of Shreya Ghoshal reused.

Broadcast
Bade Achhe Lagte Hain premiered on Sony Entertainment Television in India on 30 May 2011. It was initially intended to run for 150 episodes but it went on to telecast a total of 644 episodes, going off-air after completing a run of 3 years, 2 months and 41 days.

Bade Achhe Lagte Hain was dubbed in Telugu and broadcast on Gemini TV as Nuvvu Nachhavu, an afternoon soap opera, premiering on 9 April 2012. Bade Achhe Lagte Hain has also been dubbed in Tamil under the title Ullam Kollai Poguthada, and it premiered on Polimer TV, on 10 December 2012, with some of the characters' names changed. 

 Integration episodes 
The show had two integration episodes with Kya Hua Tera Vaada on 4 and 5 December 2012 and one with Kehta Hai Dil...Jee Le Zara on 6 December 2013.

 Sequel 

In July 2021, a sequel for the series was announced, with the title 'Bade Achhe Lagte Hain 2'. Nakuul Mehta was finalized as the male-lead of the sequel with character 'Ram'. And Disha Parmar was approached and locked by the makers, doing her second project with Mehta after seven years.

On 12 August 2021, the first teaser for the same was unveiled featuring leads, Mehta and Parmar, as Ram Kapoor and Priya.

The show premiered on 30 August 2021.

 Reception 

 Response Bade Achhe Lagte Hain had a television viewer rating of 1.3 in the debut week after its premiere, which increased ten weeks later to 3.7. It became the fifth most-watched Hindi television show in the thirty–fourth week (14–20 August) of 2011 in India, helping propel the broadcasting channel, Sony Entertainment Television India to number two in the rankings of the Hindi general entertainment television channels. The soap opera had a television viewer rating of 3.7 that week while Sony Entertainment Television India recorded a gross rating point of 245. In the forty eighth week of 2011 (25 November – 1 December), the soap opera became the fourth most-watched television show in India with a TVR of 4.30, and is the seventh most-watched of 2011.

Episode #166 of Bade Achhe Lagte Hain, directed by Anil V. Kumar and telecast on 12 March 2012, portrayed the protagonists (Ram and Priya) consummating their marriage. The episode was backed by a teaser to draw hype and interest. Within minutes of its telecast the episode went viral on YouTube with nearly 150,630 hits and counting. It also trended on social networking and microblogging sites such as Twitter. India Today described the episode as "aesthetically shot" whileTimes of India described it as "action packed". There was mocking of the episode and the overweight Ram Kapoor from some segments; Ram Kapoor responded that he would not lose weight for the television industry. IBN Live commented, "Indian television is still a good few decades immature when it comes to sex on the TV screen. So much for all the matured relationships and relevant themes – love making on Indian TV is as painful and archaic as the shaking flowers replacing actors on screen when they kiss or make love. A small sigh of relief and Ekta Kapoor and the director can congratulate themselves for the real onscreen peck on the lips." The episode was hyped as a couple on an Indian television had never before been so bold. The episode worried certain viewers who did not want to watch the episode with their children. Emirates 24/7 called it a "shocker to the Indian families". Yet India Today described it as a "big surprise for the audiences". Times of India rated the consummation scene as the Top Intimate Moment on TV. The last couple who had kissed on Indian television was Aditya Jakhar (Raqesh Vashisht) and Priya Jakhar (Ridhi Dogra) in the STAR Plus soap opera, Maryada...Lekin Kab Tak? in 2010. Following the telecast of the episode Ram Kapoor tweeted a thank you.Bade Achhe Lagte Hain is the second most-watched fictional Hindi television show in the weekdays of the twenty-ninth week of 2012 (15–21 July) with a Television Rating Point (TRP) of 4.2, which was 0.5 points up from the TRP of the previous week (8–14 July) when the show had a TRP of 3.7. In early January 2013, the soap opera's TRP went down to 2.3.

In a 2014 poll conducted by Shaadi.com, Ram and Priya were voted the Favourite TV Couple by 42.3% of Indians. Fans even dub the on-screen couple Raya (also written as RaYa), which is a linguistic blend of the pair's names. Ram Kapoor was also called "the Indian husband we love" by a Sunday publication in 2012. Ram Kapoor and Sakshi Tanwar later came together to portray the role of a couple in the ALTBalaji web-series Karrle Tu Bhi Mohabbat, which premiered in 2017 and was noted for its common plot elements with Bade Achhe Lagte Hain.

 Accolades Bade Achhe Lagte Hain  won the Kalakar Award for the Best Serial in 2012. In addition, the show has won six Indian Television Academy Awards,  three Star Guild Awards,  five Indian Telly Awards, three FICCI Frames Excellence Honours and two People's Choice Awards (including the Favourite TV Drama'' award).

Footnotes

References

External links
 
 Official webpage on balajitelefilms.com
 Official webpage on sonyliv.com
 

Balaji Telefilms television series
Sony Entertainment Television original programming
Indian drama television series
Indian television soap operas
2011 Indian television series debuts
2014 Indian television series endings
Television shows based on plays
Television shows set in Mumbai
Indian romance television series